PAD written in all-caps, such as in an acronym, may refer to:

Media and entertainment
 Peter Allen David, American writer
 Poker After Dark, a poker television show which features sit and gos and cash games
 Puzzle & Dragons, a 2012 Japanese mobile game developed by GungHo Online Entertainment

Organizations
 Pakistan Association Dubai, a Pakistani expatriate organisation
 Pakistan Association of the Deaf, a Pakistani organisation representing deaf people
 People's Alliance for Democracy, a Thailand political group
 People's Action for Development, an Indian NGO
 Phi Alpha Delta, a fraternity
 Propaganda and Agitation Department of the Central Committee of the Workers' Party of Korea

Science and technology

Computing
 Packet Assembler/Disassembler, a communications device
 Portable Application Description, a document format
 Program-associated data, a type of broadcast information
 PAD, a C1 control code used for padding

Medicine and psychology
 Peripheral artery disease, a vascular disease that causes ulcers (wounds) to develop on the legs and feet
 Peroral anti-diabetics, a group of medications to treat diabetes mellitus
 PAD emotional state model, a psychological model based on pleasure, arousal and dominance
 Pre-Operative Autologous Donation, when a patient's own blood is taken for possible use during surgery

Other technologies
 Prithvi Air Defence, a missile

Other uses
 Pontoon Assembly Detachment of the U.S. Navy Seabees
 Pre-Authorized Debit or direct debit, a financial transaction in which one withdraws funds from another person's account
 London Paddington station's station code
 Paderborn Lippstadt Airport's IATA code

See also

PADS (disambiguation)
Pad (disambiguation)